is a Japanese former beauty pageant titleholder who won the 2009 edition of Miss Nippon. She was the fourth woman to win the title while still in high school. Later she enrolled in Waseda University to study economics.

Notes 

Japanese beauty pageant winners
Japanese idols
21st-century Japanese actresses
Japanese television personalities
1991 births
People from Tokyo
Miss Nippon
Living people
Waseda University alumni